Walls And Mirrors is a computer science textbook, for undergraduates taking a second computer science course (typically on the subject of data structures and algorithms), originally written by Paul Helman and Robert Veroff. The book attempts to strike a balance between being too mathematically rigorous and formal, and being so informal, practical, and hands-on that computer science theory is not taught.

The "walls" of the title refer to the abstract data type (ADT) which has a wall between its public interface and private implementation. Early languages like Pascal did not build this wall very high; later languages like Modula-2 did create a much stronger wall between the two; and object-oriented languages such as C++ and Java implement walls using the class concept.

The "mirrors" of the title refer to recursion. The idea is of looking at a reflection in two mirrors placed in opposition to one another, so a repeated image is reflected smaller and smaller in them.

Editions 
The first edition, which used the language Pascal, was published in 1986.

An edition that used Modula-2 was published in 1988. Modula-2 had much better support for the sort of ADT the book taught than Pascal.

Later editions from the mid-1990s and the 2000s used C++ and Java, reflecting a fundamental shift in how computer science was taught. The original authors' names have been removed from the most recent editions of the book.

Publication history
 Walls and Mirrors, Intermediate Problem Solving and Data Structures (Pascal edition) (1986), Paul Helman and Robert Veroff.  (Benjamin Cummings Publishing Co.)
 Walls and Mirrors, Intermediate Problem Solving and Data Structures (Modula-2 edition) (1988), Paul Helman and Robert Veroff.  (Benjamin Cummings Publishing Co.)
 Intermediate Problem Solving and Data Structures: Walls and Mirrors, Second Pascal edition, (1991),  Paul Helman, Robert Veroff, and Frank M. Carrano.  (Benjamin Cummings Publishing Co.)
 Data Structures and Problem Solving with Turbo Pascal: Walls and Mirrors, (1993), Frank M. Carrano, Paul Helman, and Robert Veroff.   (Benjamin Cummings Publishing Co.)
 Data Abstraction and Problem Solving with C++: Walls and Mirrors, (1995), Frank M. Carrano, Paul Helman, and Robert Veroff.  (Benjamin Cummings Publishing Co.)
 Data Abstraction and Problem Solving with C++: Walls and Mirrors, Second edition, (1998), Frank M. Carrano, Paul Helman, and Robert Veroff.  (Addison Wesley Longman, Inc.)
 Data Abstraction and Problem Solving with Java: Walls and Mirrors, (2001), Frank M. Carrano and Janet J. Prichard. . (Addison Wesley Longman, Inc.)
Data Abstraction and Problem Solving with C++: Walls and Mirrors, Third edition, (2002), Frank M. Carrano and Janet J. Prichard.  (Pearson Education, Inc.)
Data Abstraction and Problem Solving with Java: Walls and Mirrors, Updated edition (2004), Frank M. Carrano and Janet J. Prichard.  (.)
Data Abstraction and Problem Solving with C++: Walls and Mirrors, Fourth edition, (2005), Frank M. Carrano.  (Pearson Education, Inc.)
Data Abstraction and Problem Solving with Java: Walls and Mirrors, Second edition, (2006), Frank M. Carrano and Janet J. Prichard. . (Pearson/Addison Wesley)
Data Abstraction and Problem Solving with C++: Walls and Mirrors, Fifth edition, (2007), Frank M. Carrano. . (Pearson Education, Inc.)
Data Abstraction and Problem Solving with Java: Walls and Mirrors, Third edition, (2011), Janet J. Prichard and Frank M. Carrano. . (Addison Wesley, an imprint of Pearson)
Data Abstraction and Problem Solving with C++: Walls and Mirrors, Sixth edition, (2013), Frank M. Carrano and Timothy M. Henry. . (Pearson Education, Inc.)
Data Abstraction and Problem Solving with C++: Walls and Mirrors, Seventh edition, (2017), Frank M. Carrano and Timothy M. Henry. . (Pearson Education, Inc.)

1986 non-fiction books
1988 non-fiction books
2004 non-fiction books
Computer science textbooks